(informally JMU) is a Japanese ship building marine engineering and service company headquartered in Yokohama, Japan.

It's Japan’s second largest shipbuilder after Imabari Shipbuilding, with shipyard facilities in Kure, Hiroshima, Yokohama, Nagasu, Kumamoto, Maizuru, Kyoto and Mie prefectures.
 
JMU's products include the design, manufacture, purchase and sale of both merchant and naval ships, offshore engineering and ship life cycle services.

History
Osaka Iron Works (Hitachi Zosen) established in 1881.  Nippon Kokan (NKK) established by Asano zaibatsu in 1912. Both united and became Universal Shipbuilding Corporation in 2002.
 
Ishikawajima Shipyard established in 1853.  Uraga Dock (Sumitomo Heavy Industries) established in 1893.  Both united and became IHI Marine United in 2002, part of Ishikawajima-Harima Heavy Industries Co., Ltd., later renamed IHI Corporation

Universal Shipbuilding Corporation and IHI Marine United Inc. united and became Japan Marine United in 2013.

In parallel, Imabari Shipbuilding bought 35% of JMU's shares. The cooperation between these two Japanese companies make it one of the largest marine engineering and shipbuilding company in the world.

References

External links
 Official site
 English part of the official site

 
Shipbuilding companies of Japan
Japanese companies established in 2013
IHI Corporation
Vehicle manufacturing companies established in 2013